Tolulope Ajayi (born 10 November 1997) better known by his stage name T-Classic, is a Nigerian singer, songwriter and recording artiste. In 2017, T-Classic signed to Mixnaija Entertainment released his lead single "I want you" produced by Killertunes. In 2019, the singer released "Think about it" which turned out to be the turning point in his career.

Early life 

T-Classic was born and raised in Agege. He is the first-born child of the Ajayi family. In 2013, Tolulope graduated from Royal Camp Comprehensive High School, Agege, Lagos. He attended Legacy Nursery and Primary School. On graduating Tolulope Ajayi was signed to Bang Music Entertainment.

Career 

On August 9, 2019 T-Classic was featured on the third official single "Yes or No" by DJ Kaywise. The song speaks love. In 2019, T-Classic song "Nobody Fine Pass You" won Most Popular Song of the Year and was nominated for Most Promising Act of the Year at City People Music Awards.

On February 7, 2020, Sony Music West Africa announced that T-Classic had joined the label's list of artistes. On February 23, 2020, he released his first EP project “Underrated” two weeks after being signed to Sony Music West Africa which featured Nigerian Disc Jockey "DJ Xclusive" . On July 21, 2019 T-Classic was featured on a live radio interview with Blessing. On 4 August 2019, Day 35 of the Reality TV Show Big Brother Naija Season 4, T-Classic performed on stage and sang one of his songs, "Nobody Fine Pass You".

In 2022, T-Classic was signed to AJ Entertainment record label.

Awards and Nomination

References 

Living people
Nigerian male singer-songwriters
Nigerian singer-songwriters
Nigerian male pop singers
Nigerian hip hop singers
English-language singers from Nigeria
Yoruba-language singers
1997 births